Gabriel Nowak (born July 26, 1986 in Rybnik) is a Polish footballer who most recently played for Kotwica Kołobrzeg.

Career

Club
In summer 2008, he was loaned to GKS Katowice on a one-year deal.
In July 2009, he signed a two-year contract with GKS Katowice.

In January 2011, he joined Górnik Zabrze on a three and a half year contract.

References

External links
 

1986 births
Polish footballers
GKS Katowice players
Górnik Zabrze players
Rozwój Katowice players
Odra Opole players
Kotwica Kołobrzeg footballers
Ekstraklasa players
I liga players
II liga players
Living people
People from Rybnik
Sportspeople from Silesian Voivodeship
Association football midfielders